The Calvary Episcopal Church', at 9 N. Villard Ave. in Red Lodge, Montana, was listed on the National Register of Historic Places in 1986.

It is an east-facing one-story gable-front frame church with a projecting gabled vestibule.  It has a wing extending to the north.  It was built in 1900 by carpenters E.S. Donnell and B.B. Baker.

References

National Register of Historic Places in Carbon County, Montana
Churches completed in 1900
1900 establishments in Montana
Episcopal church buildings in Montana